"Aus und vorbei" is a song by German boy band Overground. It was written by Mark Tabak, Deema, Gena Wernik, Mark Joker, O.K.A.N., and band member Akay Kayed for the group's second studio album 2. OG (2004), while production was helmed by Tabak and Wernik. Released as the album's lead single on July 5, 2004, the ballad reached number ten on the German Singles Chart and made it to the top forty in Austria.

Formats and track listings

Charts

References

2004 songs
Overground (band) songs
Polydor Records singles